Claire Adams (24 September 1898 – 25 September 1978) was a silent film actress and benefactor. She was born in Canada, studied there and in England, and developed a movie career in Hollywood. She spent the second half of her life in Australia.

Death 
Adams died on 25 September 1978, in Windsor, Victoria, aged 80, and was cremated.

Filmography

References

Photoplay Dec,1924
Film Index, No 3, 1970, p. 12
Social History Report on Morramong, Skipton by D. Hellier (1989). National Trust of Australia, Victoria branch.

External links

Archival collections
Guide to the Claire Adams Photographs. Special Collections and Archives, The UC Irvine Libraries, Irvine, California.

Other

Profile and picture at Northern Stars
Biography in the Australian Dictionary of Biography

1896 births
1978 deaths
Canadian expatriates in Australia
Canadian silent film actresses
Canadian nurses
Canadian women nurses
Actresses from Winnipeg
20th-century Canadian actresses
Canadian film actresses
20th-century Canadian philanthropists
19th-century Australian women
20th-century Australian women
Canadian expatriates in the United Kingdom
Canadian expatriate actresses in the United States
Canadian emigrants to Australia